Ryan Patrick Garton (born December 5, 1989) is an American professional baseball pitcher who is a free agent. He played in Major League Baseball (MLB) for the Tampa Bay Rays in 2016 and 2017 and the Seattle Mariners in 2017 and 2019.

Career

Tampa Bay Rays
Garton attended J. W. Mitchell High School in New Port Richey, Florida, and Florida Atlantic University, where he played college baseball for the Florida Atlantic Owls. In 2011, he pitched in summer college baseball for the Bethesda Big Train.  The Tampa Bay Rays selected him in the 34th round of the 2012 Major League Baseball draft.

The Rays promoted Garton to the major leagues on May 25, 2016, and he made his major league debut the next day in the seventh inning of a game against the Miami Marlins, allowing three earned runs on two innings pitched.

Seattle Mariners
On August 6, 2017, the Rays traded Garton and Mike Marjama to the Seattle Mariners for Anthony Misiewicz, Luis Rengifo, and a player to be named later or cash considerations. He was outrighted to AAA on October 26, 2017. He spent all of 2018 with AAA Tacoma Rainiers.He was assigned to AAA Tacoma Rainiers to start the 2019 season. He had his contract selected to the major leagues on May 17, 2019. He was designated for assignment on May 21. He elected free agency on October 8, 2019.

Minnesota Twins
On November 26, 2019, Garton signed a minor league contract with the Minnesota Twins. Garton was released by the Twins organization on September 4, 2020.

Retirement
On March 7, 2021, Garton joined the coaching staff of Heisler Heat Baseball, a baseball academy ran by former minor league baseball player Adam Heisler.

Acereros de Monclova
On July 21, 2021, Garton came out of retirement and signed with the Acereros de Monclova of the Mexican League. He was released on August 5, 2021 after posting a 7.00 ERA in 8 appearances.

References

External links

1989 births
Living people
Sportspeople from Clearwater, Florida
Baseball players from Florida
Major League Baseball pitchers
Tampa Bay Rays players
Seattle Mariners players
Florida Atlantic Owls baseball players
Hudson Valley Renegades players
Bowling Green Hot Rods players
Charlotte Stone Crabs players
Montgomery Biscuits players
Durham Bulls players
Tacoma Rainiers players
Acereros de Monclova players
American expatriate baseball players in Mexico